is a  fictional character from the Tekken fighting game franchise by Bandai Namco Entertainment and main antagonist of the Tekken 3 and the final boss of the game. Since his debut, Ogre has featured intermittently in the Tekken series with non-player roles in Tekken 4 as cameo and Tekken 5 in Devil Within Mode (only True Ogre), with several appearances in crossover games outside the Tekken franchise. He has received mostly positive critical reception for his design and characterization.

Appearances

Tekken series
Ogre is believed to be a biological weapon abandoned on earth by an ancient alien race, while he is additionally worshipped by ancient Aztecs as the "God of Fighting".  In Tekken 3 (1997), Heihachi Mishima sends his personal army, the Tekken Force, to search a temple in central Mexico, but they are promptly obliterated by Ogre. Having witnessed his power firsthand, Heihachi seeks an opportunity to use him in hopes of creating the ultimate life form while staving off his own aging process, and therefore stages the third edition of the King of Iron Fist Tournament held throughout the Tekken series in order to draw Ogre out. In the meantime, Ogre kills King in combat, beats Baek Doo San into a yearlong coma, and supposedly kills Jin's mother Jun Kazama. Paul Phoenix defeats Ogre in the tournament finals, but he then quits the competition under the impression that he has won, when he had one last opponent remaining in Ogre's true form, True Ogre. Heihachi then collects blood samples and skin tissue from the creature in order to splice his genomes with his own, but the project is unsuccessful, as he is missing a key ingredient called the "Devil Gene", which the series protagonist Jin Kazama and his father Kazuya possess. In Tekken 5 (2004), Ogre is playable in the "Arcade History" mode and is the final boss of the "Devil Within" minigame, where clones of him and Heihachi are defeated by Jin Kazama. 

Ogre appears in the noncanonical games Tekken Card Challenge and Tekken Mobile, and is playable in the spinoff titles Tekken Tag Tournament and in Tekken Tag Tournament 2, whereas the latter Tag game has his True Ogre form as part of the starting roster and simply dubbed as Ogre since its arcade version, while his initial form, Ancient Ogre is exclusively free downloadable post-launch character.

Design and gameplay
Ogre is the Tekken series' first main villain unrelated to the Mishima family. His first form, Ancient Ogre resembles a tall, muscular humanoid with dark green skin and red glaring eyes. He adorns various types and pieces of old Aztec jewelry and a large golden helmet/crown with very long orange hair. He is also has a small round shield that is said to be the fabled Stone of the Sun, the Aztec calendar attached to his left arm. His True Ogre form differs greatly in appearance, resembling a gargoyle sporting large wings and horns with his neck enveloped in fur, and massive claws on his feet and left hand with the right composed of a writhing snake. As of Tekken Tag 2, True Ogre’s design has been updated to have a darker colored body, and sports white beard, with his right arm now composed a series of writhing snakes. A swimsuit costume for True Ogre was included with pre-orders of Tekken Tag Tournament 2. In 2014, after a fan posted a still image from Tekken 3 on Twitter showing a silhouetted Ogre holding a disembodied head, Harada repeatedly denied it was that of Jun Kazama. His language however was Japanese lines reversed, although there is a video that has the Japanese lines re-reversed.

Ogre does not have a specific fighting style, as it is borrowed from those of many different series characters. He achieves his "True Ogre" form after absorbing the soul of Heihachi Mishima (or his grandson if the player plays as Heihachi).

Other games and merchandise
Ogre makes a cameo appearance in the 2005 tactical role-playing game Namco x Capcom as a non-playable boss. Ogre is selectable in the 2012 crossover fighter Street Fighter X Tekken, in which he serves as a final boss and is part of the storyline of the game's characters traveling to the Antarctic in pursuit of an artifact called "Pandora's Box". His Swap Costume is modeled after Gill, the final boss of Street Fighter III. It elongates Ogre's hair to about the same length as Gill's and colors it blonde, as well as coloring Ogre's body to a two tone shade of red and blue much like Gill. According to the download blurb, Ogre's appearance changed after he defeated and absorbed Gill.

While he is not physically seen, Ogre's presence is felt in the final scene of Tekken: The Motion Picture. Ogre appears in the Netflix anime series Tekken: Bloodline as the main antagonist.

The character appeared in several Tekken-related comic books published between 1997 and 2012. Bandai Namco released an Epoch Co. Tekken 3 action figure of True Ogre in 1999.

Reception
Ogre was rated the 23rd-best Tekken character in 2017 by Gavin Jasper of Den of Geek: "True Ogre has the overkill you’d want in a final boss, but the understated green statue of an Aztec warrior has its own ominous feel to it." However, he considered it "for the best that he never became a recurring villain. Tekken 3 was enough and it springboarded the Mishima bloodline feud into a new direction upon his death." In 2021, Gavin Jasper also ranked Ogre as the 9th "Best Fighting Game Final Boss": "Ogre is the one Tekken boss who doesn’t directly tie into the Mishima family. It’s refreshing and makes the whole world feel bigger.Ogre didn’t last long in the Tekken series, but his death brought forth the rivalry between Heihachi and Jin, springboarding the Mishima war into a new direction." Kevin Wong of Complex said of True Ogre in 2013: "Heihachi + Ogre = Holy shit. When we first saw this beast in Tekken 3, we were intimidated, and that was before he started breathing fire. Mountains of quarters were wasted on conquering this behemoth. In the first Tekken Tag Tournament, True Ogre was the ultimate, broken partner, forming the backbone of nearly every team in every competition. Tom Goulter of GamesRadar said in 2012, "Ogre's lack of a sombrero, a penchant for Salsa dancing, or any known connection to drug crime marks him as one of the more progressive Latino videogame characters in recent years."

Lucas Sullivan of GamesRadar included the Namco X Capcom roster among his "15 most bizarre crossovers in gaming" in 2012: "The day that Captain Commando, Klonoa, Huitzil, and Ogre co-exist in the same game is a grand day indeed." In 2012, FHM listed Ogre and Akuma as one of the "10 Awesome Fantasy Fights in Street Fighter X Tekken". In 2013, Complex's Gus Turner ranked Ogre the 19th "Most Feared God in Video Games": "An Aztec deity, Ogre is the God of Fighting, which, obviously, makes him a pretty good fit for the Tekken series. Just take a look at him. What else needs to be said?" In 2015, CDKeys rated him the sixth-best fighting game villain: "True Ogre is a great visual, and helped players enjoy an epic conclusion to one of the PlayStation’s best fighting games." In Game Rant list "Tekken: The 5 Best & 5 Worst Fighters Of All Time", Ogre was ranked among the best: "A recurring series villain, it’s not to be trifled with, boasting an unpredictable range of moves from characters from across the series." TheGamer ranked Ogre's true form as the 4th "Strongest Tekken Character, while in the other article, his true and ancient form were ranked as the 3rd and 2nd "Best Tekken Bosses", respectively. Computer and Video Games named Ogre one of "Tekken 's worst ever characters" in 2011, describing him as "look[ing] more in-character on a Mardi Gras float passing out flower garlands than he does being hit in the face by Paul Phoenix". In a 2012 fan poll held by Bandai Namco, Ogre was only the 47th-most requested out of 54 Tekken characters for inclusion in the unreleased crossover Tekken X Street Fighter, receiving 1,994 (2.26%) of 88,280 votes.

See also
List of deities in fiction

Notes

References

Deity characters in video games
Extraterrestrial characters in video games
Fictional gods
Fictional Nahua people
Fictional characters with immortality
Fictional murderers
Fictional martial artists in video games
Fictional mixed martial artists
Male characters in video games
Male video game villains
Namco antagonists
Shapeshifter characters in video games
Tekken characters
Video game bosses
Video game characters introduced in 1997
Video game characters who have mental powers
Video game characters who can move at superhuman speeds
Video game characters who can teleport
Video game characters with fire or heat abilities
Video game characters with slowed ageing
Video game characters with superhuman strength